The 2015 Wofford Terriers football team represented Wofford College in the 2015 NCAA Division I FCS football season. They were led by 28th-year head coach Mike Ayers and played their home games at Gibbs Stadium. They were a member of the Southern Conference. They finished the season 5–6, 3–4 in SoCon play to finish in a tie for fourth place with the Samford Bulldogs.

Schedule

 Source: Schedule

References

Wofford
Wofford Terriers football seasons
Wofford Terriers football